In the 2013 CONCACAF Gold Cup the main disciplinary action taken against players comes in the form of red and yellow cards.

Any player picking up a red card is expelled from the pitch and automatically banned for his country's next match, whether via a straight red or second yellow. After a straight red card, FIFA will conduct a hearing and may extend this ban beyond one match. If the ban extends beyond the end of the finals (i.e. if a player is sent off in the match in which his team was eliminated), it must be served in the team's next competitive international match(es).

Disciplinary statistics
 Total number of yellow cards: 68
 Average yellow cards per match: 2.72
 Total number of red cards: 4
 Average red cards per match: 0.16
 First yellow card: Will Johnson – Canada against Martinique
 First red card: Jacky Berdix – Martinique against Panama
 Fastest yellow card from kick off: 5 minutes – Richard Menjivar – El Salvador against Honduras
 Fastest yellow card after coming on as substitute: 1 minute – Evral Trapp – Belize against Cuba
 Latest yellow card in a match without extra time: 90+4 minutes – Jairo Jiménez – Panama against USA
 Fastest dismissal from kick off: 38 minutes – José David Velásquez – Honduras against Trinidad and Tobago
 Fastest dismissal of a substitute: none
 Latest dismissal in a match without extra time: 81 minutes – Ian Gaynair – Belize against Cuba
 Latest dismissal in a match with extra time: none
 Least time difference between two yellow cards given to the same player: 17 minutes – Ian Gaynair – Belize against Cuba (Gaynair was booked in the 64th minute and again in the 81st resulting in his dismissal.)
 Most yellow cards (team): 7 –  (4 teams) Haiti, Costa Rica, USA, Cuba, 
 Most red cards (team): 1 – (4 teams) Martinique, Cuba, Belize, Honduras
 Fewest yellow cards (team): 3 – Canada
 Most yellow cards (player): 3 – Ian Gaynair (Name in bold indicates 2 yellows in same game.)
 Most red cards (player): 1 – (4 players) Jacky Berdix, José David Velásquez, Ariel Martínez, Ian Gaynair 
 Most yellow cards (match): 5 – (5 matches) El Salvador vs Haiti, Cuba vs Belize, USA vs Costa Rica, Honduras vs Costa Rica, USA vs. Panama
 Most red cards (match): 1 – (4 matches) Panama vs Martinique, Honduras vs Trinidad and Tobago, Cuba vs Belize, Panama vs Cuba
 Fewest yellow cards (match): 0 – (2 matches) Mexico vs Panama, Costa Rica vs Cuba
 Most cards in one match: 5 yellow cards + 1 second yellow - Cuba vs. Belize

Sanctions

By match
Note: In this table the "Yellow" column counts only the first yellow card given to a player in a match. If a player receives a second yellow in the same match this is counted under "Second yellow". This second yellow is not counted as a "Straight Red".

By referee

By team

Disciplinary Record, 2013 Concacaf Gold Cup